Wondolowski may refer to:
Bill Wondolowski (b. 1946), American football player
Chris Wondolowski (b. 1983), American soccer player